Picorandan is a mountain of Catalonia, Spain. It is part of the Catalan Pre-Coastal Range.
Its maximum elevation is 991 metres above sea level.

See also
 Catalan Pre-Coastal Range.

References

Mountains of Catalonia
Baix Camp